Miraj Senior was one of two Maratha princely states during the British Raj: 'Miraj Junior' and Miraj Senior. The two states separated in 1820. It was under the southern division of the Bombay Presidency, forming part of the southern Mahratta Jagirs, and later the Deccan States Agency.

Miraj Senior measured  in area. According to the 1901 census, the population was 81,467. In 1901, the state enjoyed revenue estimated at £23,000, and paid £800 in tribute to the British Raj. The Raja resided in the town of Miraj (population 18,425 in 1901), which was a junction on the Southern Maratha Railway.

History

The State of Miraj was founded before 1750 and was the former capital of the pre-British State of Sangli. In 1820, the state was divided between a Senior and Junior branch. The territory of both branches was widely scattered among other native states and British districts.

The rulers of the Patwardhan dynasty used the title of Raja, and were of the same clan that ruled nearby Jamkhandi. Raja Govind Rao Patwardhan, 1st Ruler of Miraj, began as a cavalry commander, distinguished himself in several expeditions against the Nizam of Hyderabad and Hyder Ali of Mysore, established the Maratha ascendancy in southern India and pushed the Maratha conquests to the frontier of Mysore.

Miraj Senior acceded to the Dominion of India on 8 March 1948 and is currently a part of Maharashtra state. Miraj is also famous for its musicians, and doctors. In the mid-nineties it had municipal corporation in combination with Sangli and thus lost the edge it had over the neighboring twin city of Sangli for two centuries.

Rulers
The rulers of Miraj state belonged to the Patwardhan dynasty and bore the title 'Rao'.

Raos
17.. - 1771                Govindrao                         (d. 1771)
1771 - 1775                Vamanrao                          (d. 1775)
1777 - 1782                Hariharrao                        (b. c.1765 - d. 1782)
1782 - 1801                Chintamanrao                      (b. 1775 - d. 1801)
1801 - 1820                Gangadharrao I

After the split
1820 - 1833        Ganpatrao I
1833 - 1855?     Narayanrao I
1855?  - 1870       Gangadharrao II
1833 - 1875         Ganpatrao II "Tatya Sahib Patwardhan"
 6 June 1875 - 1939         Gangadharrao III "Bala Sahib Patwardhan"      (b. 1866 - d. 1939) (from 1 January 1903, Sir Gangadhar Rao II)
11 Dec 1939 – 15 August 1947  Narayanrao II "Tatya Sahib Patwardhan"   (b. 1898 - d. 1984)
 Shrimant Madhavrao “Rao Saheb” Patwardhan I (b. 1923 - d. 1999)
 Shrimant Gangadharrao IV “Bala Saheb” Patwardhan (b. 1946 -
 Shrimant Vasant Raje Patwardhan (b. 1944 - d. 1991)
 Rajkumari Yamuna Vasant Patwardhan / Naykude (b. 1948 - 
 Yuvraj Agastyanand Vasant Raje Patwardhan (b. 1974 -
 Shrimant Keshav Rao/Patwardhan (b. 1985 -
 Shrimant Arjun Rao/Patwardhan  (b. 1992 -

See also
 Maratha Empire
 List of Maratha dynasties and states
 Political integration of India

References

External links
 List of rulers of Miraj Senior

Princely states of Maharashtra
Bombay Presidency
Sangli district